The banana industry is an important part of the global industrial agrobusiness.
About 15% of the global banana production goes to export and international trade for consumption in Western countries. They are grown on banana plantations primarily in the Americas.

Ecological impact

As is the case with all monocultures, the intensive agroindustrial methods for banana production have considerable environmental impact. Banana cultivation requires a large amount of pesticide and  can encourage ecosystem destruction through deforestation. Moreover, food miles and plastic packaging leave a large carbon footprint.

Cash crop
Bananas are the most popular fruit in the United States, with more consumed annually than apples and oranges combined.
In spite of the multitude of banana species across the world, even only taking into account the cultivated ones, industrial production is dominated by the Cavendish banana.

Spread of plant disease
Tropical Race 4 is thought to be distributed globally by soil-contaminated equipment from the multinational plantation owners.

Companies
In 2013, five multinational fruit companies alone controlled 44% of the international banana trade:

The market share of the above players decreased from 70% in 2002 to about 44% in 2013. This decline in market power has been attributed to a couple of reasons. In the past, multinational companies owned a large number of plantations in Central and South America and other banana-producing regions. Since the 1980s they have divested a large share of their own production, replacing it with greater purchases from independent producers. For example, Chiquita has decreased the number of its plantations in Central America. Fyffes used to own plantations in Jamaica, Belize and the Windward Islands, but withdrew from production and switched to purchasing its bananas through contracts with producers. The disengagement from production was partly caused by legal and economic problems at the plantation level, but also reflects the change in market power along the banana value chain.

Along the global banana supply chain, major supermarket chains in the US and EU have gained market power over the big producers in the 21st century as they dominate the retail market and increasingly purchase from smaller wholesalers or directly from growers.

Production and export

In 2016, world production of bananas and plantains was 148 million tonnes, led by India and China with a combined total (only for bananas) of 28% of global production (table). Other major producers were the Philippines, Ecuador, Indonesia, and Brazil, together accounting for 20% of the world total of bananas and plantains (table).

As reported for 2013, total world exports were 20 million tonnes of bananas and 859,000 tonnes of plantains. Ecuador and the Philippines were the leading exporters with 5.4 and 3.3 million tonnes, respectively, and the Dominican Republic was the leading exporter of plantains with 210,350 tonnes.

Controversy 
The global banana industry has been involved with multiple human rights violations since its inception in the late 19th century. These include slavery and forced child labor among others and as of 2021, the Rainforest Alliance has identified Côte d'Ivoire as the country with the highest risk of forced labor, followed by Cameroon, Ghana, Guatemala and Ecuador among other banana exporting countries.

See also
Fruit production
Banana republic

References

External links
http://www.bananalink.org.uk
http://www.foodispower.org/bananas/
http://www.worldstopexports.com/bananas-imports-by-country/
http://www.worldstopexports.com/bananas-exports-country/
https://waycool.in/insights-blog/supply-chain-management-in-banana-integration-of-tradition-and-innovation-of-worlds-favorite-fruit/

 
Tropical agriculture